The Detroit Yacht Club (DYC) is a private yacht club in Detroit, Michigan, located on its own island off of Belle Isle in the Detroit River between the MacArthur Bridge and the DTE generating plant. The DYC clubhouse is a restored 1920s Mediterranean-style villa that is the largest yacht club clubhouse in the United States.

DYC is a member of the Detroit Regional Yacht-racing Association (DRYA).

History

The club was founded by Detroit sailing enthusiasts in 1868. The first Yacht Club buildings, a small clubhouse and boatshed, were constructed in the late 1870s at the foot of McDougall Street, just south of Jefferson Avenue. In the early 1880s, the members were divided over the club's growing social activities, and in 1882, one group broke away to form the Michigan Yacht Club. The remainder elected James Skiffington Commodore (the club's title equivalent to the "President" of other recreational and social organizations) in 1884.

The original Belle Isle clubhouse was built at a cost of $10,000 (with a further $2,000 for furnishings) in 1891, but burned down in 1904. A new facility was quickly built at the same site.

In 1923, the present-day clubhouse was dedicated; its construction had cost more than one million dollars, the work of architect George D. Mason, who also designed the Detroit Masonic Temple (the world's largest) and the opulent Gem Theatre. By the end of the following year, membership had reached 3000. Prominent member and Commodore Gar Wood set world speed records in hydroplanes, and with his Gold Cup victories brought the club to national and even worldwide prominence. Beginning in 1921, the DYC started sponsoring the hydroplane races. Membership declined dramatically during the Great Depression, and some services were suspended.

In 1946, all bonds had been paid, and the club was debt-free. The club's women formed the first women's sailing organization in the country and raced the club's catboats. During the next decade, dining facilities would be expanded, and theater-quality projection equipment installed in the ballroom, where Sunday evening screenings became a regular feature of club life. There has recently been an effort to bring back Sunday night movies.

During the 1960s, an outdoor, Olympic-size swimming pool was added, and the West End docks were built, increasing the number of boat wells to over 350. The DYC has long been a symbol of privilege and exclusivity. Up until the 1970s, Black applicants were routinely rejected, until psychiatrist Dr. Leonard Ellison filed a lawsuit, and became the first Black member.

More recently, the club added additional facilities like a fitness center and opened the Bitter End lounge area to allow for women to enter. Before the restoration, the Bitter End could only be accessed through the men's locker room. The newly restored Bitter End is also used for hosting small parties.

In 2018, the Detroit Yacht Club celebrated its sesquicentennial (150th) anniversary. Raymond W. Batt Jr. was elected to serve as the Commodore of the Detroit Yacht Club during the sesquicentennial year.

Clubhouse

The Detroit Yacht Club clubhouse was designed by architect George D. Mason in a Mediterranean Revival style. The building sits on a man-made island constructed from fill dirt excavated from other construction projects. The cornerstone of the building was laid in 1922 by Gar Wood and the building was completed in 1923. The clubhouse is a rambling, informal structure. Of particular note are the two grand staircases and the wood-panelled second-floor ballroom.

Facilities
 Racquetball Courts
 Indoor and Outdoor Pools
 Outdoor Hot Tub
 Outdoor Tennis courts
 Bocce Ball Court
 Volleyball Court
 Indoor and outdoor restaurant
 Marina for over 300 boats

Annual events
 Officer's Ball (Often called Commodore's Ball)
 Vice Commodore's Ball (Also called Clean-up Day)
 Memorial Day Celebration
 Hydroplane Racing Weekend
 Venetian Weekend

Groups within the club
 The Outriggers
 The Pelicans
 Metro Club
 The Flying Scots
 Ski Club
 Garden Club
 Sea Serpents
 Kayak Club
 Rod and Gun club
 The Voyagers
 The Seagulls
 DYC Business Networking group
 DYC Swim Team (MICSA League)

Notable members
 Gar Wood (former Commodore)
 Edsel Ford
 Horace Dodge
 Charles Kettering
 Gus Schantz
 Fred Fisher
 Robert Oakman

References

External links
The Detroit Yacht Club

1868 establishments in Michigan
Buildings and structures completed in 1924
Buildings and structures in Detroit
Clubhouses in Michigan
Clubhouses on the National Register of Historic Places in Michigan
Clubs and societies in Michigan
Metro Detroit
National Register of Historic Places in Detroit
Organizations based in Detroit
Sports clubs established in 1868
Renaissance Revival architecture in Michigan
Sailing in Michigan
Sports in Detroit
Sports venues in Detroit
Yacht clubs in the United States